BLN may refer to:

Ballygunge Junction railway station, in Kolkata
Bellefonte Nuclear Plant, an unfinished nuclear power plant in Hollywood, Alabama
UCI team code of Team BridgeLane, an Australian UCI Continental road cycling team
IATA code of Benalla Airport, east of Benalla, Victoria, Australia
bln, common abbreviation for billion